The First Film is a 2015 British documentary film about cinema pioneer Louis Le Prince, made by David Nicholas Wilkinson. It argues the case that Le Prince, rather than the Lumière brothers, was the true inventor of moving pictures, making Roundhay Garden Scene in Leeds in 1888. Le Prince mysteriously disappeared in 1890.

Mark Kermode, film critic of The Guardian, described the film as "a flickering story that blends intrigue, industrial espionage, and possibly even murder".

The film's world premiere was at the 2015 Edinburgh International Film Festival. It went on general release in the United States in September 2016.

When the film was released in UK cinemas it attracted a great deal of publicity as the story was not generally well known. Radio 4’s Today Programme, News at Ten, CBS This Morning and many others all had editorial features about the film. It played in over 30 cinemas in the UK and has been screened on Channel 4 and SKY Arts. It played in film festivals in Russia, the USA, Ireland, Belgium, Turkey and others but not in France. All the French film festivals said that the Lumieres were the first to make film even though one of the people featured in the Roundhay Garden Scene and easily identified died several years before the Lumiere’s film was made. In The First Film, Wilkinson finds the grave.

References

External links

2015 films
2015 documentary films
British documentary films
Documentary films about historical events
Documentary films about films
History of film
Louis Le Prince
2010s British films